The 1918 Columbia Lions football team was an American football team that represented Columbia University as an independent during the 1918 college football season. In his second and final season, head coach Fred Dawson led the team to a 2–4–3 record, outscored  by opponents.  

The team played its home games on South Field, part of the university's campus in Morningside Heights in Upper Manhattan.

Schedule

References

Columbia
Columbia Lions football seasons
Columbia Lions football